The 1906 Philadelphia Phillies season was a season in Major League Baseball. The Phillies finished fourth in the National League with a record of 71 wins and 82 losses.

Preseason 
The Phillies conducted their spring training in 1906 in Savannah, Georgia where the team practiced and played exhibition games at Bolton Street Park. It was the third successive year the Phillies trained in Savannah.

1906 Philadelphia City Series

The Phillies played five of nine scheduled games against the Philadelphia Athletics for the local championship in the pre-season city series. The Athletics defeated the Phillies, 4 games to 1.

The Phillies moved to 15-18 against the A's after the 1906 series.

Regular season 
On May 1, 1906, Phillies pitcher Johnny Lush pitched a no-hitter against Brooklyn at Washington Park. The Phillies won 6–0; Lush struck out 11 batters, walked three, and one batter reached first on a Doolin error.

Season standings

Record vs. opponents

Roster

Player stats

Batting

Starters by position 
Note: Pos = Position; G = Games played; AB = At bats; H = Hits; Avg. = Batting average; HR = Home runs; RBI = Runs batted in

Other batters 
Note: G = Games played; AB = At bats; H = Hits; Avg. = Batting average; HR = Home runs; RBI = Runs batted in

Pitching

Starting pitchers 
Note: G = Games pitched; IP = Innings pitched; W = Wins; L = Losses; ERA = Earned run average; SO = Strikeouts

Other pitchers 
Note: G = Games pitched; IP = Innings pitched; W = Wins; L = Losses; ERA = Earned run average; SO = Strikeouts

References 

1906 Philadelphia Phillies season at Baseball Reference

Philadelphia Phillies seasons
Philadelphia Phillies season
Philly